Acqua Panna is an Italian brand of bottled water and one of the world's largest bottled water brands. Acqua Panna takes its name from Villa Panna in the hills of Tuscany, where the natural spring was first discovered. The water was first bottled in 1880, and was subsequently the first still (uncarbonated) water to be produced in plastic bottles within the boundaries of Italy.

Origin

History

In the 16th century the powerful ruling family of the Medicis in Florence owned the spring, and it was fenced off as their private property.  The family had fresh drinking water from this preserved natural spring, whereas many other unclaimed springs were contaminated with animal waste.

This brand now belongs to San Pellegrino, which is owned by Nestlé, which distributes it into Europe and North America.

References

External links
 
 

1880 establishments in Italy
Bottled water brands
Italian brands
Italian drinks
Mineral water
Nestlé brands